The American Music Award for Favorite Male Artist – Soul/R&B has been awarded since 1974. Years reflect the year in which the awards were presented, for works released in the previous year (until 2003 onward when awards were handed out on November of the same year). The all-time winner in this category is Luther Vandross with 7 wins stretching across three decades. Chris Brown is the most nominated male artist with 12 nominations.

Winners and nominees

1970s

1980s

1990s

2000s

2010s

2020s

Category facts

Multiple wins

 7 wins
 Luther Vandross

 6 wins
 Stevie Wonder

 4 wins
 Michael Jackson
 Usher

 3 wins
 Chris Brown
 Lionel Richie
 The Weeknd

 2 wins
 Babyface
 Bruno Mars
 R. Kelly

Multiple nominations

 12 nominations
 Chris Brown

 9 nominations
 Michael Jackson

 8 nominations
 Luther Vandross
 Stevie Wonder

 7 nominations
 Prince
 The Weeknd

 6 nominations
 R. Kelly
 Usher

References

American Music Awards
Rhythm and blues
Awards established in 1974
1974 establishments in the United States